Acousmatic Sorcery is the debut  album by Chicago singer-songwriter  Willis Earl Beal, released on April 2, 2012 by Hot Charity/XL Recordings.

Track listing

Charts

References

https://web.archive.org/web/20121012165440/http://www.creativereview.co.uk/cr-blog/2012/march/acousmatic-sorcery-by-willis-earl-beal

2012 debut albums
Hot Charity (record label) albums
Willis Earl Beal albums